Le Cordon Bleu is a hotel management and culinary arts college in Adelaide, South Australia.

The college opened in 1992 with the creation of the International College of Hotel Management in Adelaide, the first of what is now three campuses in Australia. The college is located on the Regency Park campus of TAFE SA and is the head office of Le Cordon Bleu Australia, but are exploring plans to relocate more centrally. Its programs lead to educational qualifications from certificates to master's degrees. The college is registered on the CRICOS to offer programs to overseas students as per the ESOS Act 2000.

While the school originally offered only an International Diploma of Hotel Management, it since expanded to provide both vocational studies and higher education in the culinary fields.

References

External links 

Australian vocational education and training providers